Alu is a village in Tõstamaa Parish, Pärnu County, in southwestern Estonia. It has a population of 18 (as of 1 January 2011).

References

External links
 Website of Tõhela region (Alu, Kiraste, Männikuste and Tõhela villages) 

Villages in Pärnu County